Daphnella angustata is a species of sea snail, a marine gastropod mollusk in the family Raphitomidae.

Description
The length of the shell attains 12 mm.

Distribution
This marine species occurs off Jeffrey's Bay, South Transkei, South Africa

References

 Sowerby III, G. B. "Marine shells of South Africa, collected at Port Elizabeth, with descriptions of some new species." Journal of Conchology 5 (1886): 1-13.
 Steyn, D.G. & Lussi, M. (1998) Marine Shells of South Africa. An Illustrated Collector's Guide to Beached Shells. Ekogilde Publishers, Hartebeespoort, South Africa, ii + 264 pp.

External links
 Conchology.be: Daphnella angustata

angustata
Gastropods described in 1886